Alfred Owen Williams (7 February 1877 – 10 April 1930) was a poet, writer and a collector of folk song lyrics who was born and lived most of his life at South Marston, near Swindon, UK.  He was almost entirely self-taught, producing his most famous work, Life in a Railway Factory (1915), in his spare time after completing a gruelling day's work in the Great Western Railway works in Swindon. He was nicknamed “The Hammerman Poet”.

Williams was born in Cambria Cottage in the village of South Marston, the son of a carpenter, and grew up in poverty after his father abandoned his wife and eight children. He became a farm labourer at eleven, and then, when he was fourteen, he entered Swindon Railway Works, where he worked as a steamhammer operator for the next twenty-three years.

Married in 1903, he pursued a demanding schedule of full-time work and private study.  He published his first of book of poems, Songs in Wiltshire, in 1909, but his health declined and he left the factory in 1914.

Williams published six volumes of poetry and a series of prose books about his home villages and others nearby, but died in poverty in 1930 in South Marston.  Life in a Railway Factory has been described as “undisputed as the most important literary work ever produced in Swindon, about Swindon.”

There is a bust of Williams by the artist Harry Carleton Attwood in the collection of Swindon Museum and Art Gallery.

References

External links
 
 
 Alfred Williams Heritage Society.
 Alfred Williams biography at SwindonWeb
 Alfred Williams images in the Swindon Local Studies Flickr Gallery

1877 births
1930 deaths
People from Swindon
English male poets
Writers from Wiltshire
20th-century English poets
Great Western Railway people
English folk-song collectors